Ethan Robson (born 25 October 1996) is an English professional footballer who plays as a midfielder for EFL League One club Milton Keynes Dons.

He began his career with Sunderland, and spent time on loan with Dundee and Grimsby Town, before joining Blackpool in 2020.

Early years
Robson was born in Houghton-le-Spring, Tyne and Wear, and attended St Robert of Newminster Catholic School in nearby Washington.

Club career

Sunderland
Robson started his career with the youth team at local side Sunderland, joining the club at the age of eight and rose through the ranks to go to a full-time professional with the first team in the summer of 2014.

He featured regularly and captained the development squad and under-23 side before signing a two-year contract extension in April 2016. Robson was named the Premier League 2 Player of the Month for August 2016.

He played three games for the under-21 side in the 2016–17 EFL Trophy, and also appeared as an unused substitute on several occasions for the first team. Robson made his first-team debut in September 2017, when he replaced James Vaughan as a late substitute in the 3–0 defeat to Everton in the EFL Cup. A few days later he made his league debut in the Championship in a home defeat to Cardiff City.

Robson was loaned to Dundee in January 2019. He made 13 appearances in the Scottish Premiership and scored twice. On 2 September 2019, Robson headed out on loan again, this time joining League Two side Grimsby Town, where he played regularly until returning to Sunderland in January 2020.

Robson was released by Sunderland when his contract expired at the end of the 2019–20 season, bringing to an end a 16-year spell with the club during which he made just nine league appearances.

Blackpool
On 6 August 2020, Robson joined League One club Blackpool on a two-year deal with an option of a third. On 11 November 2020, he scored his first goal for the club in a 3–0 EFL Trophy win over Leeds United U21s.

Robson joined League One club Milton Keynes Dons on a season-long loan on 1 July 2021. He made his league debut for the club on 7 August 2021 in a 3–3 draw away to Bolton Wanderers on 7 August 2021. Robson scored his first MK Dons goal in a 1–0 home league win over Portsmouth on 11 September 2021. On 17 January 2022, Robson was recalled early from his loan by Blackpool due to injuries within the squad, amid rumours MK Dons had made two failed bids to sign him permanently. Robson was released from his Blackpool contract in May 2022, at the end of the 2021–2022 season.

Milton Keynes Dons
On 15 June 2022, Robson's former loan club Milton Keynes Dons announced he would be returning to the club on a permanent basis effective 1 July 2022 following his release from Blackpool.

Career statistics

Honours
Blackpool
EFL League One play-offs: 2020–21

Individual
Premier League 2 Player of the Month: August 2016

References

External links

1996 births
Living people
English footballers
People from Houghton-le-Spring
Footballers from Tyne and Wear
Association football midfielders
Sunderland A.F.C. players
Dundee F.C. players
Grimsby Town F.C. players
Blackpool F.C. players
Milton Keynes Dons F.C. players
English Football League players
Scottish Professional Football League players